In Euclidean geometry, the British flag theorem says that if a point P is chosen inside a rectangle ABCD then the sum of the squares of the Euclidean distances from P to two opposite corners of the rectangle equals the sum to the other two opposite corners.
As an equation:

 

The theorem also applies to points outside the rectangle, and more generally to the distances from a point in Euclidean space to the corners of a rectangle embedded into the space. Even more generally, if the sums of squares of distances from a point P to the two pairs of opposite corners of a parallelogram are compared, the two sums will not in general be equal, but the difference of the two sums will depend only on the shape of the parallelogram and not on the choice of P.

The theorem can also be thought of as a generalisation of the Pythagorean theorem. Placing the point P on any of the four vertices of the rectangle yields the square of the diagonal of the rectangle being equal to the sum of the squares of the width and length of the rectangle, which is the Pythagorean theorem.

Proof 

Drop perpendicular lines from the point P to the sides of the rectangle, meeting sides AB, BC, CD, and AD at points W, X, Y and Z respectively, as shown in the figure. These four points WXYZ form the vertices of an orthodiagonal quadrilateral.
By applying the Pythagorean theorem to the right triangle AWP, and observing that WP = AZ, it follows that
 
and by a similar argument the squares of the lengths of the distances from P to the other three corners can be calculated as
 
  and
 

Therefore:

Naming

This theorem takes its name from the fact that, when the line segments from P to the corners of the rectangle are drawn, together with the perpendicular lines used in the proof,  the completed figure resembles a Union Flag.

See also

 Pizza theorem

References

Further reading 
Nguyen Minh Ha, Dao Thanh Oai:  An interesting application of the British flag theorem. Global Journal of Advanced Research on Classical and Modern Geometries, Volume 4 (2015), issue 1, pp. 31–34.
Martin Gardner, Dana S. Richards (ed.): The Colossal Book of Short Puzzles and Problems. W. W. Norton, 2006, pp. 147, 159 (problem 6.16)

External links 

British Flag Theorem at artofproblemsolving.com
Can You Solve Microsoft's Rectangle Corners Interview Question? (video, 5:41 mins)

Euclidean geometry
Theorems about quadrilaterals
Pythagorean theorem